The Sheh Dyrri Tekke or Sheikh Duri Tekke is a teqe in Tirana, Albania. It is a Cultural Monument of Albania.

References

Cultural Monuments of Albania
Buildings and structures in Tirana
Sufi tekkes in Albania